The 1984 United States Senate election in New Hampshire was held on November 6, 1984. 

Senator Gordon Humphrey was re-elected to a second term in office.

Republican primary

Candidates
 Gordon J. Humphrey, incumbent Senator

Results
Senator Humphrey was unopposed for re-nomination by the Republican Party.

Democratic primary

Candidates
 Norman D'Amours, U.S. Representative from New Hampshire's 1st congressional district

Results
Representative D'Amours was unopposed for the Democratic nomination.

Independents and third parties

Libertarian
 Saunder "Sandy" Primack

General election

Campaign
During the campaign, D'Amours accused Humphrey of being "ultraconservative." Humphrey, long considered a target for Senate Democrats, may have been helped by his support of environmental programs, including an increase for Superfund spending.

Results

See also 
 1984 United States Senate elections

References 

1984
New Hampshire
United States Senate